Pressignac is a commune in the Charente department in southwestern France.

The village has thirty or so hamlets scattered around the outskirts. These include: Bandes, Bonetève, Bors, Bouchet, Bournet, Château Banal, Chauffie, Croix, Fayolles, Fontceeverane, Fougeras, Gardette, Les Gouttes, Le Grand Wood, Grand Chalais, Guerlie, Guierce, Judie, Magniéras, Mandat, Chez Mariaud, Martin, Martinie, Mas du Baud, Minor, Pers, Petit Chalais, Puymis, Valette, Veilleraud, Vouéras.

The Asteroid

200 million years ago, an asteroid with a diameter of 1.5 km struck the earth between the current hamlets of Judie, Valette and Babaudus. The impact left a crater 21 km in diameter that has long since been destroyed by erosion. The rocks within it were substantially changed more than 5 km deep. The rocks resulting from this cataclysm around Pressignac are unique: fractured and melted, they are called impact breccias and these rocks have been used for the construction of houses and farm buildings in the immediate area.

Protohistory

The Hallstatt civilization during the Iron Age used a road from Narbonne to Nantes and Brittany. This old road crosses the municipal territory of Pressignac, passing by Mandat, the Bost de la Herse, the Motte, the Négrerie and Besses wood, skirting two buildings dating from this time.

Caesar's camp, on the Petit Chêne hill, between Bors and Mandat, is a 100-meter square surrounded on three sides by an embankment almost three meters wide and one meter high. Despite its name, it was not a Roman camp (although it is likely that the Romans reused it). One hypothesis is that this camp was to be a kind of caravanserai, a stage on this trading route of the Iron Age. Neolithic axes found in large numbers around might also suggest an occupation of this prehistoric site. This land also served much later, shortly before the war of 1870, as a field of military maneuvers.

Population

See also
 Rochechouart impact structure
Communes of the Charente department

References

Communes of Charente